Porté-Puymorens is a railway station 1 km south-west of Porté-Puymorens, Occitanie, France. The station is on the Portet-Saint-Simon–Puigcerdà railway. The station is served by TER (local) and Intercités de nuit (night trains) services operated by the SNCF. The station is 1529m above sea level.

Train services
The following services currently call at Porté-Puymorens:
night service (Intercités de nuit) Paris–Toulouse–Pamiers–Latour-de-Carol
local service (TER Occitanie) Toulouse–Foix–Latour-de-Carol-Enveitg

References

Railway stations in Pyrénées-Orientales
Railway stations in France opened in 1929